John Willey Alexander Baker, Jr. (born August 15, 1942) was an American and gridiron football player who played professionally for the New York Giants of the National Football League (NFL), the Hamilton Tiger-Cats and Montreal Alouettes of the Canadian Football League (CFL), and Birmingham Americans and Houston Texans of the World Football League (WFL). He won the Grey Cup with Hamilton in 1972.  Baker played college football at Norfolk State University.

References

1942 births
Living people
Sportspeople from Portsmouth, Virginia
Players of American football from Virginia
Players of American football from Michigan
American football defensive linemen
Norfolk State Spartans football players
New York Giants players
Birmingham Americans players
Houston Texans (WFL) players
American players of Canadian football
Canadian football defensive linemen
Montreal Alouettes players
Hamilton Tiger-Cats players
Players of Canadian football from Virginia